The Čierny Hron Railway (in Slovak: Čiernohronská železnica or ČHŽ) is a narrow gauge railway in the Slovak Ore Mountains, built as a forest railway for logging operations.

History

Planning for the railway began in 1898 and building began in 1908. In 1909 regular wood transport on the railway started, between Čierny Balog and Hronec. The network was extended to transport wood from the forests and by the middle of the 20th century the railway had a total length of 131,97 km, the most extensive forestry railway network in Czechoslovakia.

On 19 July 1927, passenger traffic was permitted on the railway between Čierny Balog and Hronec, which operated until 1962.

The railway was closed in 1982, but it has been granted national heritage status since. During the following few years it was repaired by enthusiasts and re-opened in 1992 as a heritage railway for tourists. The line is now 17 km long: Chvatimech - Hronec - Čierny Balog - Vydrovo.

The line is believed to be the only railway in the world to pass through the middle of a soccer stadium, the tracks running along the front of a grandstand at the stadium belonging to the TJ Tatran Čierny Balog club.

In 2021 the railway acquired the existing rolling stock from the Waldenburg railway in Switzerland.

Motive Power

See also 
 The Historical Logging Switchback Railway in Vychylovka
List of transport museums in Slovakia
List of museums in Slovakia

References

External links
  Official site
 Čierny Hron Forest Railway
 ČHŽ Railway Map
 Photo collection of heritage railway operations on the ČHŽ
 bahnbilder.de

Railway lines in Slovakia
Heritage railways in Slovakia
760 mm gauge railways in Slovakia
Forest railways